Lim Young-woong (born June 16, 1991) is a South Korean trot, ballad and pop singer, entertainer and YouTuber. He signed with Mulgogi Music in 2016 and debuted as a singer with his first single "Hate You". Four years later, he rose to stardom after competing on the reality television show Mr. Trot, where he won the first place out of 17,000 applicants. In 2021, Lim achieved his first number-one song on the Gaon Digital Chart with the single "My Starry Love".

Since his debut in 2016, Lim has released one studio album and one collaborative medley album, scoring four Gaon Digital Chart number-ones. He is also the first trot artist ever to receive the Gold Play Button for achieving one million subscribers on his official YouTube channel.

Career

2016–2019: Career beginnings
Lim initially dreamed of being a ballad singer, but later discovered his talent as a trot singer after winning an Excellence Prize at a singing contest. At the contest held in his native city of Pocheon, he performed 's song "What's Wrong with My Age?", considering the age groups of audiences.

In 2016, Lim then appeared on KBS1's singing competition show Korea Sings, winning an Excellence Prize there after performing 's song "If You Smile, You'll Get Younger, If You Get Angry, You'll Only Get Older". This experience made him dream of his career as a trot singer in earnest. He also appeared as a contestant in the first season of SBS' music reality show Fantastic Duo that year. Shortly after, he signed with his current label Mulgogi Music.

On August 8, 2016, the singer made his debut through the release of digital single "Hate You". He then released another single entitled "What's So Important?" on January 2, 2017. However, these two singles did not do well commercially.

Lim slowly gained popularity through his appearance in KBS1's morning show , where he became the final winner of its televised audition "Challenge! Dream Stage". On March 28, 2018, he released his third single "Elevator". The song was re-arranged and released under the title "Not by Stairs, but by Elevator" almost five months later. On December 21 that year, Lim released a collaborative medley album with fellow trot singer , titled Newness of Trot. The album's popularity at expressway rest areas made him called the "Expressway Idol Star".

Lim was appointed as the ambassador for the city of Pocheon on July 23, 2019.

2020–present: Mr. Trot and rising popularity
Lim entered TV Chosun's music competition show Mr. Trot, which aired from January 2 to March 14, 2020. During the final episode of the show, he was eventually crowned the winner out of 17,000 applicants. He said, "I'm so thankful for my mother and grandmother. The live finals were held on the anniversary of my father's passing. I'll think he gave us a gift because he felt sorry for leaving my mother alone. I really thank my father as well." After the show ended, he additionally signed a one-and-a-half-year management contract with New Era Project.

On April 3, 2020, Lim released a single titled "Trust in Me". Written by lyricist Kim Eana and composer , the track was produced as a special song for Lim as the Mr. Trot winner. "Trust in Me" attained commercial success, becoming Lim's first top-20 single in his native country. The song debuted at number 20 on South Korea's Gaon Digital Chart, later peaking at number 11. At the end of the year, it earned him a Melon Music Award for Best Trot and a Genie Music Award for Best Trot Track.

Lim was ranked 5th (5.8%, tied with singer Lee Hyori) for leading the Mr. Trot craze and occupying the advertising world. Later that year, the magazine named him one of the "100 Leaders for the Next Generation".

In addition to his singing career, Lim made his cameo appearance on TV Chosun's historical fantasy series Kingmaker: The Change of Destiny. On October 1, 2020, he made his debut as an emcee, co-hosting the first annual Trot Awards with television presenter Kim Sung-joo and actress Jo Bo-ah. He also made his big screen debut through Mr. Trot: The Movie, a musical documentary film starring the top six finalists of Mr. Trot. The film was a commercial success, selling more than 150,000 tickets after release.

On November 4, 2020, Lim collaborated with SsangYong Motor on the promotional single "Hero". Unlike his previous singles, the song's musical style approximates pop music. He premiered the track at an online showcase hosted by the company. Despite not being heavily promoted after release, "Hero" gave Lim his first top-10 single on the Gaon Digital Chart, debuting and peaking at number seven.

On December 16, 2020, Lim was announced as a winner of the 2021 Korea Image Awards, being awarded as a member of Trot Men, the top six finalists of Mr. Trot. They were given the Stepping Stone Award for "their work on revitalizing the lives of people exhausted from COVID-19 and spreading out trot music all over the world".

As a result of his rising popularity in 2020, Lim became the most searched figure on web portal Naver that year. At the end of the same year, according to the annual survey conducted by Gallup Korea for Singer of the Year, he was named one of the five most favorite singers by both people aged 13–39 ( 4) and people aged 40 and over (no. 1). Furthermore, he was the second most-streamed artist domestically on YouTube that year, only behind boy band BTS.

Lim released the single "My Starry Love" on March 9, 2021, one year after winning Mr. Trot. Five days prior to its release, he premiered the song at the finals of the second season of Miss Trot. "My Starry Love" debuted atop the Gaon Digital Chart, making it the first number-one single of his career. The song also earned Lim the first music program award ever since his debut, winning first place on MBC's Show! Music Core. This feat made him the first trot artist to receive a music show win in 14 years since  on KBS2's Music Bank in 2007.

On May 2, 2022, Lim released his first studio album, Im Hero, which includes a wide range of genres aside from ballad and trot, such as pop rock, reggae hip-hop, jazz, and folk pop. One of the tracks from the album titled "Our Blues, Our Life" was pre-released on April 17.

On November 15, 2022, Lim released the double single "Polaroid", containing the pop rock tracks "Polaroid" and "London Boy". The latter marks his first songwriting credit as a lyricist and composer.

As a YouTuber
Lim began using his eponymous YouTube channel in 2016 with an official audio video for the debut song "Hate You". On December 4 that year, he uploaded his first song cover video featuring his cover of Nam Jin and Jang Yoon-jeong's duet song "I Like You". Since then, Lim has promoted himself, steadily posting his song cover videos there. He has also communicated with his fans through the channel, posting contents including behind-the-scenes, live performance videos, highlight clips, comment reading, birthday live broadcast, and vlogs. On February 23, 2021, Lim opened a YouTube Shorts channel named "Lim Young-woong Shorts", with his 28-second competition practice video for Mr. Trot uploaded the same day.

Lim received the Silver Play Button for having more than 100,000 subscribers on his official channel in March 2020. In October that same year, the channel surpassed one million subscribers, making him the first trot artist to achieve this feat. He expressed his gratitude through a handwritten letter by saying, "All of you gave me the honor of having one million subscribers [on YouTube]. I'll always do my best, never forgetting my first time, just like how desperate I was at the beginning." He received the Gold Play Button the following month.

The most-viewed video on Lim's official channel is his Mr. Trot performance of "The Story of an Old Couple in Their 60s". As of November 15, 2021, it has gained over 47 million views.

Philanthropy 
On March 8, 2022, Lim donated  million to the Fruit of Love Social Welfare Community Chest to help the victims of the massive wildfire that started in Uljin, Gyeongbuk and has spread to Samcheok, Gangwon.On March 11, 2022, it was confirmed that Lim donated  million for the February Good Han Star singing competition. to children with pediatric leukemia.

On June 9, 2022, Lim donated  million prize money from the May Song competition in Good Han Star to support emergency medical expenses for childhood cancer patients, leukemia and it is rare that incurable sickness.

On August 8, 2022, Lim donated 2 million won for the July Good Han Star singing competition, to the Emotional Support Program for Children with Pediatric Leukemia and their Families.

On September 1, 2022, Lim donated 2 million won for the August Good Han Star singing competition, to the Emotional Support Program for Children with Pediatric Leukemia and their Families.

In October 2022 Lim donated 1.5 million won as prize money from the Good Han Star Singer Competition to patients with childhood cancer deficiencies, leukemia and incurable diseases.

On November 4, Lim donated 1.5 million won in Sunhan Star Gawangjeon's prize money in October to support the emotional support of children with pediatric cancer, leukemia, and incurable diseases.

On December 23, 2022, Lim donated 300 million won on behalf of the 'Heroic Age' fandom via The Fruit of Love Social Welfare Community Chest.

In January 2023, Lim donated a total of 2 million won to Good Star Gawangjeon from December 2022.

Discography

 Im Hero (2022)

Filmography

Film

Music show

Variety show

Television series

News and current affairs

Hosting

Radio show

Concerts and tours

Awards and nominations

Notes

References

External links
 

1991 births
Living people
Mr Trot participants
People from Pocheon
Singing talent show winners
21st-century South Korean male singers
Trot singers